Kingdom of the Planet of the Apes is an upcoming American science fiction action film directed by Wes Ball from a screenplay by Josh Friedman, Rick Jaffa and Amanda Silver, and Patrick Aison, and produced by Joe Hartwick Jr., Jaffa, Silver, and Jason Reed. Produced and distributed by 20th Century Studios, it is intended to be the sequel to War for the Planet of the Apes (2017) and the fourth installment in the Planet of the Apes reboot series. It stars Owen Teague in the lead role alongside Freya Allan, Peter Macon, Eka Darville, and Kevin Durand.

Development on the film began in 2019, following Disney's acquisition of Fox, with Ball attached as director. Much of the script was written during the COVID-19 pandemic, with casting commencing in June 2022 following the script's completion. Teague was cast in the lead role in August, with the film's title and additional casting revealed in the following months. Filming began in October in Sydney and wrapped in February 2023.

Kingdom of the Planet of the Apes is scheduled to be released in the United States on May 24, 2024.

Premise 
Years after the events of War for the Planet of the Apes (2017), many ape clans have emerged in the oasis where Caesar led his fellow apes to, while humans have regressed into a feral state. One ape leader perverts the teachings of Caesar to enslave other clans in search of the last traces of a secret human technology, while another ape embarks on a journey to find freedom side by side of a young girl.

Cast

Production

Development 
In October 2016, Dawn of the Planet of the Apes (2014) and War for the Planet of the Apes (2017) director Matt Reeves said that he had ideas for a fourth film in the Planet of the Apes reboot series. In mid-2017, as War was released, Reeves and co-writer Mark Bomback expressed further interest in sequels. Reeves said that Steve Zahn's character, Bad Ape, established a primate world "much larger" than just Caesar's group of apes, adding that there are apes "who grew up without the benefit of Caesar's leadership" and suggesting that conflict would arise if Caesar's apes should encounter such outsiders. Bomback felt that "there was probably only one more big chapter left to tell", explaining how Caesar "came to be this Moses figure in the Apes world". He suggested that other filmmakers might work on the sequel and that it could take place hundreds of years after War. Despite this, he clarified that there had not been conversations on a potential sequel, expressing his desire to "take a breather and let things rest a bit." In April 2019, following its acquisition of 20th Century Fox, Disney announced that further Planet of the Apes films were in development. In August, it was confirmed that any future installments would be set in the same universe first established in Rise of the Planet of the Apes (2011). In December, it was announced that Wes Ball would write and direct the film, after having previously worked with Reeves on a Mouse Guard film. After that film was canceled by Disney following the merger, Disney approached Ball on developing a new Planet of the Apes film.

In February 2020, Ball confirmed that the film would not be a reboot, instead chronicling "Caesar's legacy". Joe Hartwick Jr. and David Starke were also confirmed to serve as producers. In April, it was announced that Peter Chernin, who produced the previous installments through Chernin Entertainment, would serve as executive producer. The film will be one of the company's last films before it leaves 20th Century Studios for Netflix. The next month, it was revealed that Josh Friedman would co-write the script with Ball, and that Rick Jaffa and Amanda Silver would return to produce the film after doing so for the previous installments. Ball and Friedman would discuss the script through Zoom video calls, a routine which continued as the COVID-19 pandemic began. Instead of a direct sequel to War, Ball stated that the film would feel more like a follow-up to the previous films, and commented that the film could begin virtual production soon in spite of the pandemic due to the fact that much of the film contained computer-generated imagery (CGI). In March 2022, 20th Century Studios president Steve Asbell stated that he was expecting a screenplay draft shortly, aiming for production to begin by the end of the year. By June, Oddball Entertainment and Shinbone Productions was also set to produce the film, while the search for the main star was underway following the script's completion the previous month. The film's title was revealed to be Kingdom of the Planet of the Apes in September 2022, with the film revealed to take place many years after the events of War. Jaffa, Silver, and Patrick Aison joined the writing team, with Ball no longer credited as screenwriter. Jason Reed and Jenno Topping were also announced as producer and executive producer, respectively, while Starke was no longer expected to serve as producer.

Casting 
In August 2022, Owen Teague joined the cast of the film in the lead motion-capture role. The next month, Freya Allan and Peter Macon joined the cast with the announcement of the film's title and release year, as did Eka Darville and Kevin Durand in October. Travis Jeffery, Neil Sandilands, Sara Wiseman, Lydia Peckham and Ras-Samuel Weld A'abzgi were added to the cast later that month, while William H. Macy and Dichen Lachman were cast in January and February 2023, respectively.

Filming 
Principal photography began in October 2022 at Disney Studios Australia in Sydney, with funding partially provided by the Australian government, under the working title Forbidden Zone. Filming concluded on February 15, 2023.

Release 
Kingdom of the Planet of the Apes is scheduled to be released in the United States on May 24, 2024.

Future 
In June 2022, it was reported that Disney and 20th Century Studios were pleased with the film's script and hoped that it would launch a new trilogy of Planet of the Apes installments.

References

External links  
 

2020s American films
2020s English-language films
2024 science fiction action films
20th Century Studios films
American science fiction action films 
American sequel films
Apocalyptic films
Chernin Entertainment films
Dystopian films
Films about apes
Films directed by Wes Ball 
Films set in the future
Films shot in Sydney
Films using motion capture
Planet of the Apes films
Upcoming English-language films
Upcoming sequel films